Anthony Richardson (born May 22, 2001) is an American football quarterback who played college football for the Florida Gators.

High school career
Richardson played for Eastside High School in Gainesville, Florida. During his high school career, he had 4,633 passing yards with 37 passing touchdowns, along with 1,633 rushing yards and 41 touchdowns. He committed to play college football at the University of Florida.

College career
Richardson appeared in just four games during his first year at Florida in 2020, completing one of two passes for 27 yards with a touchdown and interception. He was able to redshirt his first year of collegiate eligibility. Richardson entered 2021 as the backup to Emory Jones, but still earned more playing time. Against LSU, he replaced Jones and completed 10 of 19 passes for 167 yards with three touchdowns, two interceptions and a rushing touchdown.

Richardson helped lead an upset over the seventh-ranked Utah Utes in September 2022. Following the end of the 2022 season, Richardson announced that he would enter the 2023 NFL Draft.

References

External links

Florida Gators bio

2001 births
Living people
Players of American football from Florida
American football quarterbacks
Florida Gators football players
Eastside High School (Gainesville, Florida) alumni
Sportspeople from Gainesville, Florida
Sportspeople from Miami